Zzyzx, formerly Soda Springs, is an unincorporated community in San Bernardino County, California, within the boundaries of the Mojave National Preserve, managed by the National Park Service (NPS), an agency of the U.S. Department of Interior, as public land. It is the former site of the Zzyzx Mineral Springs and Health Spa and now the site of the Desert Studies Center. The site is also the location of Lake Tuendae, originally part of the spa, and now a refuge habitat of the endangered Mohave tui chub.

It runs from Interstate 15 generally south to the Zzyzx settlement.

History

Curtis Howe Springer made up the name Zzyzx and gave it to the area in 1944, claiming it to be the last word in the English language. He established the Zzyzx Mineral Springs and Health Spa in 1944 at the spot, which was federal land, after filing mining claims for  surrounding the springs. He used the springs to bottle his water and provide drinks for travelers through the hot desert. Springer also imported animals from around the country to attract more families to visit his ranch. He used Zzyzx until 1974 when the land was reclaimed by the government.

In 1976, the Bureau of Land Management and the California State University agreed to cooperatively manage the land in and around Zzyzx, and establish the CSU Desert Studies Center. In 1994, the United States Congress passed the California Desert Protection Act, establishing the Mojave National Preserve on the former BLM land, and further formalized the partnership between the National Park Service and the California State University Desert Studies Center.

Lexicography
The name appeared as "Zzyzx Springs" in Dmitri Borgmann's 1967 book Beyond Language. In 1977, Borgman noted his source as being "an old, undated map of San Bernardino County published by the Automobile Club of Southern California" and repeated his description of the settlement as being "a hydrologic feature and privately owned spa in San Bernardino County, California, about 8.5 miles south of Baker, on the western edge of Soda Dry Lake, off the abandoned right-of-way of the old Tonopah and Tidewater Railroad."  After Borgmann's book, the 1973 Hammond Ambassador World Atlas began to show the place, labeling it as "Zzyzx" without the "Springs"; the 1976 Rand-McNally Commercial Atlas and Marketing Guide followed suit.

Zzyzx as a settlement, and Zzyzx Spring as a water feature, were approved as a place name by the United States Board on Geographic Names on June 14, 1984.  As is the case with the road, Zzyzx, California, is the USBGN's lexicographically greatest (alphabetically last, at least in Latin alphabetical order) place name.

Zzyzx has frequently been noted on lists of unusual place names. Zzyzx was declared the "most difficult to pronounce" place name in California by Reader's Digest.

In popular culture
The plot of Michael Connelly's 2004 Harry Bosch novel, The Narrows, revolves around a crime committed in Zzyzx.

The community was featured by Huell Howser in California's Golden Parks Episode 160.

The 2006 films Zzyzx and Zyzzyx Road both involve characters taking advantage of the unpopulated desert area.

The American rock band Stone Sour references the community's 4.5-mile-long road in their 2007 song of the same name off of their album Come What(ever) May.

See also
Zyzyxia
Xyzzy (disambiguation)

References

External links

 USGS GNIS entries:
 
 
 
 Zzyzx photos and historical information
 Center for Land Use Interpretation site page with directions, details, photos, and map link
  — also part 2 and part 3

Populated places in the Mojave Desert
Springs of San Bernardino County, California
Unincorporated communities in San Bernardino County, California
Mojave Desert
Tonopah and Tidewater Railroad
Populated places established in 1944
1944 establishments in California
Unincorporated communities in California